The Corps of Canadian Voyageurs was raised in September 1812, by the British Army, as a military water transportation corps. Its mission was to maintain the supply lines, between Montreal and the western posts. The corps was disbanded in March 1813, and its mission was taken over by the Canadian branch of the British Commissariat Department, a department of HM Treasury, as the Provincial Commissariat Voyageurs. This corps was disbanded in March, 1815.

Organization
The Corps of Voyageurs was organized on the initiative of the North West Company, and its bourgeois and engagés became the officers and men of the corps. The Provincial Commissariat Voyageurs had one lieutenant-colonel, one major, one captain, ten lieutenants, ten conductors (sergeants acting as guides), and about 400 private men.

The army wanted to put the corps into uniform, but that was impractical due to its duties. Instead of a uniform the men of the corps wore the dress of the ordinary civilian voyageurs.

Weapons
The Army-issued swords, pikes and pistols were impractical, and they were thrown away or sold and the men used their own frontier weapons: they were issued with brown bess muskets, axes and knives.

Discipline
The Corps was known for its lack of discipline, at least in comparison with the iron discipline required by the British Army. However, it fulfilled an absolutely essential function, in the "wilderness war".

Officers of the Corps of Canadian Voyageurs
 William McGillivray, Lieutenant-colonel, commanding officer.
 Angus Shaw, Major
 Archibald Norman McLeod, Major
 William McKay, Captain
 Pierre de Rastel de Rocheblave, Captain
Source:

Honour of Perpetuation within the Canadian Army
The Canadian Grenadier Guards perpetuates the honours of both corps.

Modern Historical Re-enactment Unit
The Modern Historical re-enactment group of the Canadian Corps of Voyageurs was organized in 1975 by John Robertson, then armourer at Old Fort William (now Fort William Historical Park). After forty years as a reenactment group, it is still a strong volunteer group (over 45 members) with Fort William Historic park, Thunder Bay, Ontario, it is a family orientated historical re-enactment group that portrays early 1800s military, voyageur militia and family life. The Corps provides Guards of Honour in many local charity events, providing heritage colour and firing salutes for visiting VIP's. The Corp provide safety training to new and old members to be confident in the proper use, care and maintenance of firearms and equipment. Members are encouraged to take an active role and participate in the group activities and camp life. Not only is the corps a historical re-enactment group, we are also a social group keenly interested in the past and informing the public about Canadian history.

See also 
 Canadian units of the War of 1812

References

British administrative corps
Army transport units and formations
Canadian military units and formations of the War of 1812
Fur trade
North West Company